The 2022–23 Irish Cup (known as the Samuel Gelston's Whiskey Irish Cup for sponsorship purposes) was the 143rd edition of the premier knock-out cup competition in Northern Irish football since its inauguration in 1881. The competition began on 13 August 2022.

Crusaders are the defending champions, having defeated Ballymena United 2–1 in the previous season's final.

Results
The league tier of each club at the time of entering the competition is listed in parentheses.
(1) = NIFL Premiership
(2) = NIFL Championship
(3) = NIFL Premier Intermediate League
(NL) = Non-league (clubs outside the Northern Ireland Football League – levels 4–7)

First round
101 clubs entered the first round of the main competition, with the first round draw being made on 7 July 2022. The matches were played on 13 August 2022.

|}

Second round
The second round draw was made on 17 August 2022. The matches were played on 17 September 2022.

|}

Third round
The third round draw was made on 20 September 2022. The matches were played on 29 October and 5 November 2022.

|-
|colspan="3" style="background:#E8FFD8;"|29 October 2022
|-

|-
|colspan="3" style="background:#E8FFD8;"|5 November 2022
|-

|}

Fourth round
The fourth round draw was made on 1 November 2022. The matches were played on 26 November 2022.

|}

Fifth round
The fifth round draw was made on 6 December 2022. The matches were played on 6 and 7 January 2023.

|}

Sixth round
The sixth round draw was made on 7 January 2023. The matches were played on 3 and 4 February 2023.

|}

Quarter-finals
The 8 sixth round winners entered the quarter-finals. The draw was made on 4 February 2023, and the matches were played on 3 and 4 March 2023.

|}

Semi-finals
The 4 quarter-final winners entered the semi-finals. The draw was made on 8 March 2023, and the matches will be played on 31 March and 1 April 2023.

|}

References

2022–23
Cup
2022–23 European domestic association football cups